Sir David Laidlaw Knox (born 30 May 1933) is a British Conservative Party politician and former Member of Parliament.

Parliamentary career
Knox first sought election for Birmingham Stechford at the 1964 and 1966 elections, but was beaten by the Labour Cabinet Minister Roy Jenkins on each occasion. In 1967, he was the Conservative candidate in a by-election at Nuneaton caused by the resignation of Frank Cousins, but he was defeated by Les Huckfield.

He was elected Conservative MP for Leek, Staffordshire from 1970 to 1983, and for Staffordshire Moorlands from 1983 to 1997, when he retired.

Knox, once in Parliament, joined what was to become the Macleod Group led by Nicholas Scott that was considered to be for Conservative MPs that were pro-European and progressive on social issues and he was noted as strongly supporting Britain's entry to the EEC. Knox protested against a decision to allow the Palestine Liberation Organization to open an office in London. He supported the abolition of capital punishment. In 1973, Knox was appointed Parliamentary Private Secretary to Ian Gilmour, then Minister of State for Defence.

Knox was appointed one of three vice-chairmen of the Conservative Party under the chairman Willie Whitelaw in 1974. He also became President of the Macleod Group, and in that position issued a statement in January 1975 supporting Edward Heath as Conservative leader. His open support for Heath probably led to his dismissal as vice-chairman in March by new leader Margaret Thatcher. In September 1975, after the Macleod Group merged with two other 'left-wing' Tory groups in June to form the Tory Reform Group, Knox became its vice-president with Nicholas Scott. Knox also became chairmen of the Parliamentary Group for World Government. In December, he voted against the return of capital punishment, unlike his new leader, who voted for its return.

On the issue of Scottish devolution Knox clashed with the Conservative Shadow Cabinet. Knox argued that "meaningful devolution of political power for Scotland" was necessary now to avoid Scots feeling the need to vote for separatist parties. By this, he meant that the body needed to have legislative powers. This ran counter to Francis Pym, who was opposition spokesman for devolution at the time, whose policy was to form a constitutional body that had neither legislative or executive powers. In February 1978 he broke from the Tory ranks and voted with the Labour Government and for the Scotland Bill.

Honours
Knox was knighted in the 1993 Birthday Honours.

References

"Times Guide to the House of Commons", Times Newspapers Limited, 1992

External links 

1933 births
Living people
Alumni of University of London Worldwide
Alumni of the University of London
Conservative Party (UK) MPs for English constituencies
Knights Bachelor
UK MPs 1970–1974
UK MPs 1974
UK MPs 1974–1979
UK MPs 1979–1983
UK MPs 1983–1987
UK MPs 1987–1992
UK MPs 1992–1997
Politicians awarded knighthoods
Politicians of the Pro-Euro Conservative Party